The  is a commuter electric multiple unit (EMU) train type operated by the private railway operator Kintetsu since 2001.

Operations
The 9820 series sets operate on Kintetsu Nara Line services, including through-running to and from Hanshin Electric Railway lines, in formations of up to ten cars in multiple with other EMUs.

Formations
, the fleet consists of ten six-car sets, based at Saidaiji Depot, formed as follows, with three motored (M) cars and three non-powered trailer (T) cars, and the 9720 car at the Namba/Kyoto end.

The motored cars are each fitted with one cross-arm or single-arm pantograph.

Interior
Passenger accommodation consists of longitudinal bench seating throughout.

See also
 Kintetsu 9020 series, similar two-car sets

References

External links

 Kintetsu "Series 21" (3220/5820/9020/9820/6820 series) train information 

Electric multiple units of Japan
9820 series
Train-related introductions in 2001
ja:近鉄9020系電車#9820系
1500 V DC multiple units of Japan
Kinki Sharyo multiple units